Huntingtons may refer to:
Huntington's disease, a genetic disorder
The Huntingtons, a punk rock band

See also
Huntington (disambiguation)